The 2018 Pac-12 Conference men's basketball tournament was the postseason men's basketball tournament for the Pac-12 Conference and was played during March 7–10, 2018, at T-Mobile Arena on the Las Vegas Strip in Paradise, Nevada. Number 1 seed Arizona defeated Number 2 seed USC in the championship game. Deandre Ayton was the Tournament MVP.

Seeds
The bracket was announced on March 3, 2018.
All 12 Pac-12 schools were eligible to participate in the tournament. Teams were seeded by conference record, with a tiebreaker system used to seed teams with identical conference records. As a result, the top four teams receive a bye to the quarterfinals of the tournament. Tiebreaking procedures were remain unchanged from the 2017 Tournament.

 Record between the tied teams
 Record against the highest-seeded team not involved in the tie, going down through the seedings as necessary
 Higher RPI:
 Head-to-head

Schedule
The tournament schedule was announced at the same time as the seeding on March 3, 2018.

Bracket
Teams were reseed after each round with highest remaining seeds receiving home court advantage.
* denotes overtime period

Game statistics

First round

Quarterfinals

Semifinals

Championship

Awards and honors

Hall of Honor
The following former players were inducted into the Pac-12 Hall of Honor on Friday, March 7, during a ceremony prior to the semifinals of the 2018 Pac-12 men's basketball tournament: Michael Wright (Arizona men's basketball), Linda Vollstedt (Arizona State women's golf), Matt Biondi (California men's swimming), Bill Toomey (Colorado men's track and field), Andrew Wheating (Oregon men's track and field), Carol Menken-Schaudt (Oregon State women's basketball), Kerri Walsh Jennings (Stanford women's volleyball), Rafer Johnson (UCLA track and field and men's basketball). Cheryl Miller (USC women's basketball), Missy Marlowe (Utah gymnastics), Sonny Sixkiller (Washington football), and Laura Lavine (Washington State women's track and field).

Team and tournament leaders

All-Tournament Team

Most Outstanding Player

Tournament notes
Eight teams were invited to postseason play from the Pac-12 conference
Three Pac-12 teams earned bids to the 2018 NCAA Division I men's basketball tournament:
Arizona: the conference and tournament champion, No. 4 seed in South Regional, 
Arizona State: No. 11 seed in Midwest Regional
UCLA: No. 11 seed in East Regional
Both Arizona State and UCLA were placed in the First Four, games between the four lowest-ranked at-large teams at Dayton, Ohio. Both teams lost their first game on the first Tuesday of the Tournament. Arizona lost its first-round game as well, leaving the Pac-12 with no teams in the round of 32.

Five Pac-12 teams were placed with at-large bids in the 2018 National Invitation Tournament, the most-ever for the Conference: USC, Utah, Oregon, Stanford, and Washington.

See also

2018 Pac-12 Conference women's basketball tournament

References

Pac-12 Conference men's basketball tournament
2017–18 Pac-12 Conference men's basketball season
Pac-12 Conference men's basketball tournament